At least two warships of Japan have been named Mochishio:

, a  launched in 1980 and struck in 2000
, an  launched in 2006

Japanese Navy ship names
Japan Maritime Self-Defense Force ship names